Rogno is a comune (municipality) in the Province of Bergamo in the Italian region of Lombardy, located about  northeast of Milan and about  northeast of Bergamo, in the Val Camonica.

Rogno borders the following municipalities: Angolo Terme, Artogne, Castione della Presolana, Costa Volpino, Darfo Boario Terme, Pian Camuno, Songavazzo.

Twin towns — sister cities
Rogno is twinned with:

  Clavesana, Italy

References